Pierre Caque (27 August 1909 – 1949) was a French basketball player. He competed in the men's tournament at the 1936 Summer Olympics.

References

External links
 

1909 births
1949 deaths
French men's basketball players
Olympic basketball players of France
Basketball players at the 1936 Summer Olympics
Sportspeople from Marne (department)